Inène Pascal-Pretre (born 9 November 1985) is a French rower. She competed in the women's coxless pair event at the 2008 Summer Olympics.

References

External links
 

1985 births
Living people
French female rowers
Olympic rowers of France
Rowers at the 2008 Summer Olympics
People from Schiltigheim
Sportspeople from Bas-Rhin